Terminal Exposure is a 1987 American comedy film directed by Nico Mastorakis.  It involves two amateur beach photographers who accidentally capture a murder on film. Searching for the only clue, a gorgeous woman with a small rose tattoo, they are drawn into an ever-deepening pool of crime and action.

Although the film is one of the many beach comedies that were produced in the late 1980s, Terminal Exposure is notable in that it was an early work in the career of composer Hans Zimmer who would go on to compose music for The Last Samurai, The Dark Knight, Madagascar and The Lion King among many other films.

References

External links
 
 
 

1987 films
American comedy films
Films scored by Hans Zimmer
1987 comedy films
Films directed by Nico Mastorakis
1980s English-language films
1980s American films